The 2019–20 Marshall Thundering Herd men's basketball team represented Marshall University during the 2019–20 NCAA Division I men's basketball season. The Thundering Herd, led by sixth-year head coach Dan D'Antoni, played their home games at the Cam Henderson Center as members of Conference USA. They finished the season 17–15, 10–8 in C-USA play to finish in sixth place. They defeated UTEP and were scheduled to play Louisiana Tech in the quarterfinals of the C-USA tournament. However, the tournament canceled due to the coronavirus pandemic.

Previous season
The Thundering Herd finished the 2018–19 season 23–14, 11–7 in C-USA play to finish in sixth place. They defeated Rice before losing to Southern Miss in the quarterfinals of the C-USA tournament. They were invited to the CollegeInsider.com Tournament where they defeated IUPUI, Presbyterian, Hampton and Green Bay to become CIT champions.

Offseason

Departures

2019 recruiting class

Roster

Schedule and results

|-
!colspan=12 style=| Exhibition

|-
!colspan=12 style=| Non-Conference Regular season

|-
!colspan=9 style=| Conference USA regular season

|-
!colspan=9 style=| Conference USA tournament

References

Marshall Thundering Herd men's basketball seasons
Marshall
Marsh
Marsh